Trails End is a 1949 American Western film directed by Lambert Hillyer and starring Johnny Mack Brown, Max Terhune and Kay Morley.

Cast
 Johnny Mack Brown as Johnny Mack 
 Max Terhune as Alibi 
 Kay Morley as Laurie Stuart 
 Douglas Evans as Mel Porter 
 Zon Murray as Clem Kettering 
 Myron Healey as Drake 
 Keith Richards as Bill Cameron 
 George Chesebro as Joe Stuart 
 William Bailey as Sheriff 
 Carol Henry as Rocky 
 Boyd Stockman as Henchman 
 Eddie Majors as Luke

References

Bibliography
 Pitts, Michael R. Western Movies: A Guide to 5,105 Feature Films. McFarland, 2012.

External links
 

1949 films
1949 Western (genre) films
American black-and-white films
American Western (genre) films
Films directed by Lambert Hillyer
Monogram Pictures films
1940s English-language films
1940s American films